George Francis King (10 January 1934 – 8 November 1994), known as  Francis X. King, was a British occult writer and editor from London who wrote about tarot, divination, witchcraft, magic, sex magic, tantra, and holistic medicine. He was a member of the Society of the Inner Light, an offshoot of the Alpha et Omega, which in turn was an offshoot of the Hermetic Order of the Golden Dawn.

Controversy 

King's 1973 publication of The Secret Rituals of the O.T.O. infuriated their order head Grady McMurtry, because the fraternity's secrets were being revealed in 1820.  In an O.T.O newsletter, McMurtry stated their policy at the time: "We do not endorse the publication of this material because the so called 9th degree section does not include the paper (titled IX degree Emblems and Modes of Use) which Aleister Crowley handed me at 93 Jermyn St circa 1943-44 e.v. without which the whole thing is nonsense."  Francis King is thought to have been given the rest of the rituals (sans the missing one) by Gerald Yorke.

Partial bibliography

 Ritual Magic in England (1887 to the Present Day) (1970) (see also 1989)
 The Rites of Modern Occult Magic (American edition, 1971)
 Sexuality, Magic and Perversion (1971)
 Astral Projection, Ritual Magic and Alchemy (1972)
 The Secret Rituals of the O.T.O. (1973)
 Crowley on Christ (1974)
 Magic: The Western Tradition (1975)
 Satan and Swastika (1976)
 Techniques of High Magic, with Stephen Skinner (1976)
 The Magical World of Aleister Crowley (1977)
 Tantra: A Practical Guide to its Teachings and Techniques
 The Cosmic Influence (1976)
 Christopher Isherwood (1976)
 The Rebirth of Magic (1982)
 The Unexplained File Cult And Occult (1985) Orbis Publishing 
 Tantra For Westerners: A Practical Guide to the Way of Action (1986)
 Rudolf Steiner and Holistic Medicine (1987)
 The Encyclopedia of Fortune-Telling (1988)
 Modern Ritual Magic: the rise of western occultism. Bridport: Prism, 1989   (previous ed. Ritual Magic in England, 1970)
 Tarot (1990)
 Witchcraft and Demonology (1991)
 Mind & Magic - An Illustrated Encyclopedia of the Mysterious and Unexplained (1991)
 The Flying Sorcerer: Being the Magical and Aeronautical Adventures of Francis Barrett (1992)
 Nostradamus: Prophecies Fulfilled and Predictions for the Millennium and Beyond by Francis X. King (1993) With Stephen Skinner
 The Complete Fortune-Teller with Paul Cooper (1994)
 Encyclopedia of Mind, Magic, and Mysteries (1995)
 The Hamlyn Encyclopedia of Fortune-Telling: Predict the Future and Plan Your Life with This Practical Guide to Techniques (1997)
 The Illustrated Encyclopedia of Fortune-Telling (2001)

Notes 

1934 births
1994 deaths
English occult writers
English Thelemites
20th-century poets
Writers from London